Znamenskoye (Ç̇ülga-Yurt) is a rural locality (a selo) in Nadterechny District of the Chechen Republic, Russia. Population: 

On May 12, 2003, a car bomb exploded at a government building here, killing fifty-nine people. On July 15, 2005, another car bomb killed fifteen.

Gallery

References

Rural localities in Nadterechny District